The 1994–95 Liga Bet season saw Maccabi Kafr Kanna, Hapoel Migdal HaEmek, Hapoel Kafr Qasim and Shikin HaMizrah win their regional divisions and promoted to Liga Alef.

At the bottom, Maccabi Nahariya, Hapoel Bnei Acre (from North A division), Hapoel Qalansawe, Hapoel Tel Hanan (from North B division), Beitar Petah Tikva, Hapoel Jaljulia, Maccabi HaShikma Ramat Hen (from South A division), Hapoel Arad and Maccabi Kiryat Malakhi (from South B division) were all automatically Relegated to Liga Gimel.

North A division

North B division

South A division

South B division

References
Alef and Bet Leagues 1995-1998  Eran R, Israblog 

4
Liga Bet seasons
Israel